Kathanera (also known as Kathanere) is a small subgroup of Jain community in the Northern India. The community was found to have very small numbers but they owned around twelve temples in total.

See also
 Jainism in India
 Jainism in Uttar Pradesh
 Golapurva
 Parwar

References 

Jainism in India
Jain communities
Social groups of India
Jainism in Uttar Pradesh